National Orthopaedic Hospital, Enugu is a federal government of Nigeria speciality hospital located in Enugu, Enugu State, Nigeria. The current  medical director is Emmanuel Iyidobi.

History 
National Orthopaedic Hospital, Enugu was established on 17 January 1975. The hospital was formerly known as Haile SelassieI Institute of Orthopaedic, Plastic and Ophthalmic Surgery.

CMD 
The current chief medical director is Emmanuel Iyidobi.

References 

Hospitals in Nigeria